Fräulein Doktor is a 1969 spy film loosely based on the life of Elsbeth Schragmüller. It was an Italian and Yugoslavian co-production directed by Alberto Lattuada, starring Suzy Kendall and Kenneth More, and featuring Capucine, James Booth, Giancarlo Giannini and Nigel Green. It was produced by Dino De Laurentiis and has a music score by Ennio Morricone. It was distributed by Paramount Pictures in the United States.

Plot
A woman spy and some male agents working for the Germans during World War I land at night near the Royal Navy base at Scapa Flow, from a U-boat. The British, led by Col. Foreman, ambush the landing party, capturing two of the men, but the woman gets away. Foreman fakes the execution of one of the spies, thus tricking the second one, Meyer, into becoming a double agent in the hopes of using him to capture his woman accomplice, whom Meyer identifies under the codename Fräulein Doktor. Fräulein Doktor is portrayed as a brilliant spy who stole a formula for a skin blistering gas similar to mustard gas which the Germans have since used to great effect against the Allies on the battlefield.

Meanwhile, Fräulein Doktor poses as a prostitute and seduces a laundryman to find out which ship Lord Kitchener will be sailing on to the Russian Empire, and when it will sail. She then helps a German U-boat to sink HMS Hampshire outside Scapa Flow with Kitchener on it, taking his life. For this, she is awarded the German Pour le Mérite. Meyer re-appears in Berlin and courts her. The German military intelligence service and its head, Col. Walter Nicolai, are suspicious of Meyer's escape from the British, but use him to poison Fräulein Doktor because of her addiction to morphine. Meyer is shown her dead body and later makes his way back to the British to confirm her death.

However, Fräulein Doktor's death was faked for Meyer's benefit so she would be free of suspicion for her next assignment, getting Allied defense plans for a German attack in Belgium.  Under cover as a Spanish contessa, she recruits Spanish nurses to staff a hospital train to serve the Allied front. During the trip from Spain to France, she brings aboard German agents who will impersonate Belgian officers to infiltrate Belgian Army headquarters and steal the plans.

Col. Foreman is still not convinced of her death and shows up at the same army headquarters with Meyer in tow. The German agents steal the plans and in a deadly shootout with sentries, one gets away back to German lines.  The Germans then launch their attack with great success, but Col. Foreman confronts Fräulein Doktor. The set for the battle was one of the most ambitious constructs of no man's land ever filmed. Meyer kills Foreman but is in turn killed by the advancing German troops. Fräulein Doktor is then whisked away by the Germans, but suffers a breakdown as she is being driven off through all the carnage and death about her.

Cast
 Suzy Kendall as Fräulein Doktor
 Kenneth More as Colonel Foreman
 Capucine as Dr. Saforet
 James Booth as Meyer
 Alexander Knox as General Peronne
 Nigel Green as Col. Mathesius
 Giancarlo Giannini as Lieutenant Hans Rupert
Ralph Nossek a Lean

Production and release
Location shooting for Fräulein Doktor took place in Yugoslavia and Hungary.

It was released in Yugoslavia under the name Gospođica Doktor - špijunka bez imena, and in Italy as Fraulein Doktor. In the United States, consideration was given to the possible titles "Nameless" and "The Betrayal". Colonel Mathesius was played by Eric von Stroheim in the 1937 film Under Secret Orders. Suzy Kendall as Fräulein Doktor was a casting choice reflecting Virginia McKenna's portrayal of the French born Violet Szabo in the WW2 action drama Carve Her Name with Pride, 1958.

Home media
In 2011 Fräulein Doktor was released on DVD by Underground Empire, most likely a bootleg. All available screenshots online refer to a TV screening on Finnish TV YLE Teema.

The soundtrack by Ennio Morricone was released on its own in 2010 by Intermezzo Media.

See also
 Elsbeth Schragmüller
 Other films about the spy known as "Mademoiselle Docteur" or "Fräulein Doktor":
 Stamboul Quest – 1934 American film starring Myrna Loy
 Mademoiselle Docteur (also known as Salonique, nid d’espions and Street of Shadows) – 1937 French film directed by G.W. Pabst
 Mademoiselle Doctor (also known as Under Secret Orders) – 1937 English film directed by Edmond T. Gréville, an English version of the above, shot at the same time, but with some cast changes.

References
Notes

External links

Fraulein Doktor at Allmovie.com

1969 films
1960s spy drama films
1960s war drama films
Italian spy drama films
Yugoslav spy films
English-language Italian films
English-language Yugoslav films
Western Front (World War I) films
World War I spy films
Italian war drama films
Lesbian-related films
Cultural depictions of Herbert Kitchener, 1st Earl Kitchener
Films directed by Alberto Lattuada
Films scored by Ennio Morricone
Films produced by Dino De Laurentiis
1969 LGBT-related films
Yugoslav war drama films
1969 drama films
Films with screenplays by Stanley Mann
1960s English-language films
1960s Italian films